Amber Court Villa D'Genting Resort is an apartment complex in Genting Highlands, Pahang, Malaysia. It contains two 23-storey apartment towers (Parkview with Block A, B, C and Hillview with Block D, E, F) including three levels of car parks and two levels of retail podiums. The estimated height is 92 m. The 741 apartments are partially used for timeshare and homestay.

History 
Amber Court is a resort-apartment venture built in Malaysia’s tiger-economy period of the 1990s. The Canadian mining company Giant Bay Resources Ltd. developed together with Samaworld (Malaysia) Sdn Bhd the new Disney-like SamaWorld theme park in the Genting Highlands.

Planning 
In 1990 Giant Bay acquired the bankrupt company Techlines Corp Sdn Bhd that owned the land surrounding SamaWorld. Techlines was renamed Giant Bay (Malaysia) Sdn Bhd. Giant Bay's Hong Kong entity Giant Bay Capital (HK) Ltd. owned Giant Bay (Malaysia). Giant Bay (Malaysia) under president Richard J. Leibel was responsible for the residential and commercial development around SamaWorld. Planned were resort apartments, hilltop condominiums, bungalows (Regency Village, Asian Village, International Village), and a hotel on an  site. The estimated total development cost was 500 million Malaysian Ringgit (ca. 188,13 million US-Dollar). The apartment project of Giant Bay Development Sdn Bhd was called Samaworld Parkview And Hillview Resort Apartments or just Resort Apartments and later Amber Court. Sometimes it is listed as Parkview and Hillview Apartments. Cost of the project was 70 million Ringgit. Planned were 688 individually owned apartments of various sizes (number later increased) with hotel-service to generate income for investors. In 1991 the freehold apartments were marketed under the slogan "Cool Investment - Hot Returns".

Financing 
Citibank N.A. (M) and Scotiabank partly financed the project. Non-Malaysian companies were required permission to carry large loans. Giant Bay negotiated a deal to carry a Citibank loan of 27 million Ringgit (ca. 10 million Dollar) but negotiations of a loan extension with Malaysia’s central bank failed. To secure funds for the project Giant Bay Capital (HK) had to sell 51% of Giant Bay (Malaysia) to the Malaysian company Campoc Realty Sdn Bhd. As a majority Malaysian-owned company it had unrestricted borrowing powers. Giant Bay (Malaysia) changed the name to Villa Genting Sdn Bhd and Giant Bay Development was called Villa Genting Development Sdn Bhd (VGD). The whole development was called Villa D'Genting Resort. In 1993 Giant Bay Resources sold the remaining 49% shares.

Construction and early years 
Infrastructure work began in October 1990. Giant Bay completed the road construction. Land Clearing work for the Resort Apartments began in February 1991. According to PR Newswire, the construction of the apartment platform was completed in 1991. The main construction started around 1994 and Amber Court opened around 1996. Architect was Gerak Reka Akitek Sdn and the consulting engineer was Angkasa Jurutera Perunding Sdn Bhd. Villa Genting Development got into a legal dispute with the construction company Teknik Cekap Sdn Bhd. Purchasers of apartments were mainly Malaysian and Singaporean investors and companies like Berjaya (held 30% interest in Villa Genting Sdn Bhd), WTK Holdings (formerly Samanda Holdings), and KFC Holdings (Malaysia). Leisure Holidays bought 36 apartments for their timeshare concept. The fully furnished rooms were used as serviced apartments for tourists and residential apartments. A variety of recreation and conferencing facilities such as sauna, gymnasium, indoor games room, conference halls (Cassa, Victoria, Jasmin and Camilla rooms), banquet halls, and a restaurant (Paloma Garden Cafe) was offered, and free shuttle service to Genting Bus Terminal was provided. Management was by VG (Villa Genting) Resort Management Sdn Bhd.

Struggle after the financial crisis 
The project got into trouble because of the Asian financial crisis 1997, and Villa Genting Development went into liquidation in 2000. Amber Court Liaison Committee (ACLC) was formed for administration. Amber Court Liaison Committee comprised Amber Court owners. Because of the financial crisis, some owners couldn’t pay for service and maintenance which made the place difficult to manage. The wet and foggy climate in Genting Highlands promoted the growth of red-colored algae or mold on the facade. The resulting neglected and abandoned appearance inspired peoples' imagination and led to many ghost stories. In 2012 Amber Court was partly renovated. This included outdoor and indoor repairs and the building was completely repainted. Shortly afterwards Amber Court started to deteriorate again. Because of new development projects in Genting Highland, owners rented out their units to companies which accommodate foreign workers in Amber Court. The remote location, illegal activities, security issues, rooftop/pipe leaking, and difficulties in water supply contributed to the decline of Amber Court. With the Strata Management Act of 2013 Amber Court Management Corporation (ACMC) was formed. Currently the building is undergoing renovation work and has a new grey paint scheme. Till today about 1.4 million Ringgit were spent.

Billion Court 

Villa Genting Properties Sdn Bhd (VGP) (also a subsidiary of Villa Genting Berhad) developed the Billion Court Resort Condominium (Hilltop Condominiums) next to Amber Court. The project was presented to purchasers in March 1996 at the Shangri-La Hotel Kuala Lumpur. Construction of the project consisting of three (initial four) 26-storey blocks, two 9-storey blocks, and a 6-storey car park started. The project cost was around 100 million Malaysian Ringgit (ca. 37 million US-Dollar). Architect was ADC Akitek Sdn Bhd and engineer was Meinhardt (Malaysia) Sdn Bhd. During construction, Villa Genting Properties got into a legal dispute with the construction company Muhibbah Engineering (M) Bhd. Billion Court could not be finished because of the Asian Financial Crisis, and Villa Genting Properties was included in the Malaysian blacklist for developers involved in abandoned projects. In 2012 the NCT Group took over the project that was inactive since 2002, and developed the site with the Ion Delemen high-rise complex.

Notable facts 

 Giant Bay was formerly a mining company specialist in bioleaching. Giant Bay and the Giant Bay Investment Fund was involved in the Canadian Immigrant Investor Program scandal where money of the immigrant investment fund ICC was missing. Affected were Taiwanese and Hong Kong immigrants which obtained their visa by investing in the immigrant fund. The court concluded that the money for the business deal in Malaysia was borrowed and repaid legitimately and Mr. Leibel was cleared of all charges.
 The earthworks for Villa Genting were carried out by the same company as for the KLCC, Saracorp Sdn Bhd.
 As of April 2022, several apartments are left unclaimed while others belonged to private owners.

In popular culture 

 Amber Court was used as a location for the 2017 horror movie Haunted Hotel.
 The German TV channel Galileo (ProSieben) made a documentary about Amber Court in 2020.

References

Further reading 

 Su, Hou Boon: Penilaian kerja penggalian tanah, pembinaan pile cap dan hand dug caisson di Projek Billion Court, Genting Highlands, Laporan (Universiti Sains Malaysia. Rancangan Latihan Penuntut). Pulau Pinang: Universiti Sains Malaysia, 1998.

External links 

 Old Amber Court website (Internet Archive)
 Old Villa Genting website (Internet Archive)
 Amber Court Logo (Internet Archive)
 Old flyer(Internet Archive)
 Banquet hall (Internet Archive)
 Paloma Garden Cafe (Internet Archive)
 Bengkel Penulisan Kreatif (Creative Writing Workshop) at Amber Court 11-13 JUN 1999 
Genting Highlands
Buildings and structures in Pahang